Two ships were named Empire Clyde:

Ship names